is a Japanese professional shogi player ranked 4-dan.

Early life and education
Tomita was born in Sanda, Hyōgo on February 13, 1996. He learned how to play shogi from his father when he was about five years old.

Tomita graduated from the College of Business Administration of Ritsumeikan University in 2018. He is the first graduate of the university to become a professional shogi player.

Shogi

Apprentice professional
Tomita entered the Japan Shogi Association's apprentice school in September 2007 under the tutelage of shogi professional Kenji Kobayashi. He was promoted to the rank of apprentice professional 3-dan in April 2013 and obtained full professional status and the rank of 4-dan after finishing second in the 67th 3-dan League (April 2020September 2020) with a record of 14 wins and 4 losses.

Promotion history
The promotion history for Tomita is as follows.
6-kyū: September 2007
3-dan: April 2013
4-dan: October 1, 2020

References

External links
 ShogiHub: Professional Player Info · Tomita, Seiya

Living people
1996 births
Japanese shogi players
Professional shogi players
Professional shogi players from Hyōgo Prefecture
Ritsumeikan University alumni